Baransky (Vulkan Baranskogo; , Sashiusu-dake) is a stratovolcano located in the central part of Iturup Island, Kuril Islands, Russia. 

The volcano is named after Nikolay Baransky, Soviet economic geographer. Its only known eruption occurred in 1951 and was cited as only minor activity.

See also
 List of volcanoes in Russia

References 

 

Iturup
Stratovolcanoes of Russia
Active volcanoes
Mountains of the Kuril Islands
Volcanoes of the Kuril Islands
Holocene stratovolcanoes